The 2013 Swiss Figure Skating Championships took place between 13 and 15 December 2012 at the Patinoire des Vernets in Geneva. Skaters competed in the disciplines of men's singles, ladies' singles, and ice dancing on the senior level. The results were used to choose the Swiss teams to the 2013 World Championships and the 2013 European Championships.

Results

Men

Ladies

Ice dance

External links
 2013 Swiss Championships results